Matías Franco Descotte was the defending champion but lost in the second round to Jurij Rodionov.

Rodionov won the title after defeating Juan Pablo Ficovich 4–6, 6–2, 6–3 in the final.

Seeds
All seeds receive a bye into the second round.

Draw

Finals

Top half

Section 1

Section 2

Bottom half

Section 3

Section 4

References

External links
Main draw
Qualifying draw

2020 ATP Challenger Tour
2020 Singles